John Fryer may refer to:

John Fryer (physician) (died 1563), English physician, humanist and early reformer
John Fryer (physician, died 1672), English physician
John Fryer (travel writer) (1650–1733), British travel-writer and doctor
Sir John Fryer, 1st Baronet (1671–1726), Lord Mayor of London
John Fryer (Royal Navy officer) (1753–1817), sailing master on the Bounty
Sir John Fryer (British Army officer) (1838–1917), British Army general
John Fryer (sinologist) (1839–1928), educator, translator, scientist
Sir John Fryer (entomologist) (1886–1948), English entomologist
John Denis Fryer (1895–1923), Australian soldier and university student
John E. Fryer (1938–2003), psychiatrist and gay rights activist
John Fryer (producer) (born 1958), rock producer

See also 
Jack Fryer (disambiguation)
John Fryer Thomas Keane (1854–1937), traveller